The 2000 Galleryfurniture.com Bowl was a post-season college football bowl game between the Texas Tech Red Raiders from the Big 12 Conference and the East Carolina Pirates from Conference USA (C-USA) at the Astrodome in Houston, Texas on December 27, 2000. It was the inaugural game in the bowl's history. The game was the final competition of the 2000 football season for each team and resulted in 40–27 East Carolina victory.

References

Galleryfurniture.com Bowl
Houston Bowl
East Carolina Pirates football bowl games
Texas Tech Red Raiders football bowl games
December 2000 sports events in the United States
Galleryfurniture.com Bowl
2000 in Houston